This is a list of destroyer classes.

Argentina (Armada de la República Argentina) 
Catamarca class — 2 ships
La Plata class — 2 ships
Cervantes class — 2 ships, ex-Churruca class
Mendoza class — 3 ships
Buenos Aires class — 7 ships, improved G class
Almirante Domecq García class — 5 ships, ex-Fletcher class
Seguí class — 3 ships, ex-Allen M. Sumner class
Comodoro Py class — 1 ship, ex-Gearing class
Hercules class — 2 ships (same as UK's Type 42 Batch 1)
Almirante Brown class — 4 ships, MEKO 360 H2

Australia (Royal Australian Navy) 
River class — 6 ships
Anzac class — 1 ship
Stalwart class — 5 ships
V and W class — 4 ships
Scott class — 1 ship
Nizam class — 5 ships
Arunta class — 3 ships
Quadrant class — 5 ships
Battle class — 2 ships
Daring class — 3 ships
Perth class — 3 ships
Hobart class — 3 ships

Austria-Hungary (Austro-Hungarian Navy)
Huszár class — 13 ships
Warasdiner class— 1 ship
Tátra class— 6 ships
Ersatz Triglav class— 4 ships

Brazil (Marinha do Brasil) 
Pará class — 10 ships
Marcilio Dias class — 3 ships
Jurua class — 6 ships ordered but requisitioned by the Royal Navy as Havant class
Acre class — 6 ships
Pará class — 7 ships, ex-Fletcher class
Mato Grosso class — 5 ships, ex-Allen M. Sumner class
Marcilio Dias class — 2 ships, ex-Gearing class
Pará class — 4 ships, ex-Garcia class

Bulgaria (Bulgarian Navy)
Fidonisy class - 1 ship
Ognevoy class - 1 ship

Canada (Royal Canadian Navy) 
M or Patriot class — 2 ships
Vancouver class — 2 ships, ex-S class
River class — 14 ships
Montgomery class — 5 ships, ex-Clemson class
St Croix class — 3 ships, ex-Wickes class
Tribal class — 8 ships
Algonquin class — 2 ships
Crescent class — 2 ships
St Laurent class — 7 ships
Restigouche class — 7 ships
Mackenzie class — 4 ships
Annapolis class — 2 ships
Iroquois class — 4 ships

Chile (Armada de Chile) 
 — 4 ships
 — 3 ships
Almirante Lynch class — 6 ships planned, 5 delivered
Serrano class — 6 ships
Almirante class — 2 ships
Blanco Encalada class — 2 ships and 1 spare ship, ex-Fletcher class
Serrano class — 4 ships, ex-Buckley class
Ministro Zenteno class — 2 ships, ex-Allen M. Sumner class
Prat class — 4 ships, ex-County class

China

People's Republic of China (People's Liberation Army Navy) 
Anshan class — 4 ships, all retired (ex-)
Sovremennyy class — 4 ships in active service
Type 051 (NATO codename Luda) — 17 ships, all retired
Type 052 (NATO codename Luhu) — 2 ships in active service
Type 051B (NATO codename Luhai) — 1 ship in active service
Type 052B (NATO codename Luyang I) — 2 ships in active service
Type 051C (NATO codename Luzhou) — 2 ships in active service
Type 052C (NATO codename Luyang II) — 6 ships in active service
Type 052D — 15 ships in active service, 6 in sea trials and 4 under construction
Type 055 — 3 ship in active service, 4 in sea trials and 3 under construction

Republic of China (Zhōnghuá Mínguó Hǎijūn) 
Chao Yang class — 14 ships (ex-)
Lo Yang class — 8 ships (ex-)
Heng Yang class — 4 ships (ex-)
Keelung class — 4 ships (ex-)

Colombia (Armada de la República de Colombia) 
Antioquia class — 2 ships, ex-Douro class
Halland class — 2 ships
Antioquia class — 1 ship, ex-Fletcher class
Caldas class — 2 ships, ex-Allen M. Sumner class

Denmark (Royal Danish Navy)
Hunt class - 3 ships

Dominican Republic (Dominican Navy)
 H class - 1 ship Trujillo
 F class - 1 ship Generalisimo

Ecuador (Armada del Ecuador) 
Hunt class - 2 ships
Presidente Eloy Alfaro class - 1 ship, ex-Gearing class

Egypt (Egyptian Navy) 
El Fateh class — 2 ships, ex-Z class
El Nasser class — 3 ships, ex-Project 30bis
 Hunt-class destroyer escort - 2 ships

Estonia (Eesti Merevägi) 
Wambola class — 1 ship, ex-Orfei class
Lennuk class — 1 ship, ex-Izyaslav class

France (Marine Nationale) 
  (1899) — 4 ships
  (1899) — 4 ships
  or Pertuisane class (1900) — 4 ships
   (1902) — 20 ships
   (1905) — 13 ships
  (1907) — 10 ships
  (1908) — 7 ships
  (1908) — 2 ships
  (1909) — 4 ships
  (1911) — 12 ships
  (1912) — 6 ships
  (1915) — 3 ships
  (1917) — 12 ships
  — 6 ships
  — 6 ships
  — 6 ships
  — 6 ships
  — 6 ships
  — 2 ships
  — 12 ships
  — 14 ships
  — 12 ships
  — 6 ships
  — 1 ship

Germany (Deutsche Marine)

Greece (Hellenic Navy)

Royal Hellenic Navy (1832–1974) 
Niki class — 4 ships
Thyella class — 4 ships
Aetos class — 4 ships
Kriti class — 4 ships ordered but requisitioned by Royal Navy as Medea class
Keravnos class — 2 ships
Hydra class — 4 ships
Vasilefs Georgios class — 2 ships, modified G class
Salamis class  — 1 ship, ex-B class
Navarinon class — 1 ship, ex-E class
Adrias class — 8 ships, ex-Hunt class
Doxa class — 2 ships, ex-Gleaves class
Wild Beast class — 4 ships, ex-Cannon class
Sfnedoni class — 6 ships, ex-Fletcher class

Hellenic Navy (1974–Present) 
Themistocles class — 7 ships, ex-Gearing class
Nearchus class — 4 ships, ex-Charles F. Adams class

India (Bharatiya Nau Sena) 

Hunt class — 8 ships
Ranjit class — 3 ships
Rajput class — 5 ships
Delhi class  — 3 ships
Kolkata class  — 3 ships
Visakhapatnam class  —1 active, 3 under construction
Project 18-class destroyer  — 6 ships planned.

Indonesia (Tentara Nasional Indonesia-Angkatan Laut) 
Gadjah Mada class - 1 ship, ex-N class
Siliwangi class — 7 ships, ex-Project 30bis upgraded to Project 30BK

Iran (Iranian Navy) 
Damavand class — 1 ship
Babr class — 2 ships
 Gearing-class - 2 ships
Jamaran class — 2 ships
Khalije Fars class — Under construction

Israel (Israeli Navy) 

Z-class destroyer - 2 ships
Hunt-class destroyer escort - 1 ship

Italy (Italian Navy)

Regia Marina (1861–1946) 
Lampo class — 5 ships
Nembo class — 6 ships
Soldato class — 10 ships
Indomito class — 6 ships
Ardito class — 2 ships
Audace class — 2 ships
Rosolino Pilo class — 8 ships
Alessandro Poerio class — 3 ships
Aquila class — 4 ships, originally ordered by Romania
Mirabello class — 3 ships
La Masa class — 8 ships
Giuseppe Sirtori class — 4 ships
 Palestro class — 4 ships
 Generali class — 6 ships
Curtatone class — 4 ships
Leone class — 3 ships
Sella class — 4 ships
Sauro class — 4 ships
Turbine or Borea class — 8 ships
Navigatori class — 12 ships
Freccia or Dardo class — 4 ships
Folgore class — 4 ships
Maestrale class — 4 ships
Oriani class — 4 ships
Soldati class — 12 ships

Marina Militare (1946–present)
 Benson class — 1 ship
 Gleaves class — 1 ship
 Fletcher class — 3 ships
Impetuoso class — 2 ships
Impavido class — 2 ships
Audace class — 2 ships
Luigi Durand de la Penne class — 2 ships
Andrea Doria class — 2 ships

Japan 

Asakaze class — 2 ships
Ariake class — 2 ships
Harukaze class — 2 ships
Ayanami class — 7 ships
Murasame class — 3 ships
Akizuki class — 2 ships
Yamagumo class — 6 ships
Takatsuki class — 4 ships
Minegumo class — 3 ships
Hatsuyuki class — 12 ships
Asagiri class — 8 ships
Hatakaze class — 2 ships
Kongō class — 4 ships
Murasame class — 9 ships
Takanami class — 5 ships
Atago class — 2 ships
Akizuki class — 4 ships
Asahi class — 2 ships
Maya class — 2 ships

Manchukuo (Manchukuo Imperial Navy) 
 Hai Wei class - 1 ship (ex-Momo class)

Mexico (Armada de México) 
Cuauhtémoc class — 2 ships, ex-Fletcher class
Quetzalcoatl class — 3 ships, ex-Gearing class
Manuel Azueta class — 1 ship, converted Edsall class

Netherlands (Koninklijke Marine) 
Wolf class (Roofdier class) — 8 ships
Admiralen class — 8 ships
Gerard Callenburgh class — 2 ships
Van Galen class — 2 ships, ex-N class
S class - 2 ships
G class - 1 ship
Q class - 1 ship
Wickes class - 1 ship
Holland class — 4 ships
Friesland class — 8 ships

Norway (Kongelige Norske Marine) 
Draug class — 3 ships
Sleipner class — 6 ships
Ålesund class - 2 ships (Never completed)
Stord class — 2 ships, ex-S class
Town class — 5 vessels on loan from the Royal Navy.
Oslo class — 4 ships, ex-C class
Hunt class — 5 ships

Pakistan (Pɑkistan Bahri'a) 
Tariq class — 3 ships, ex-O class
Taimur class — 4 ships, ex-C class
Badr class — 2 ships, ex-Battle class
Tariq class — 3 ships, ex-Gearing class
Babur class — 1 ship, ex-County class
Tariq class — 5 ships, ex-Amazon-class

Peru (Marina de Guerra del Perú) 
Teniente Rodríguez class — 1 ship
Almirante Guise class — 1 ship, ex-Izyaslav class
Almirante Villar class — 1 ship, ex-Orfei class
Villar class — 2 ships, ex-Fletcher class
Palacios class — 2 ships, ex-Daring class
Garcia y Garcia class — 1 ship, ex-Holland class
Colonel Bolognesi class — 7 ships, ex-Friesland class

Poland (Marynarka Wojenna) 
Wicher class — 2 ships
Grom class — 2 ships
Garland — 1 ship, ex-G class
Piorun class — 1 ship, ex-N class
Orkan class — 1 ship, ex-M class
Hunt (Batch III) class — 3 ships
Bourrasque class - 1 ship
Wicher class — 2 ships, ex-Project 30 class
Warszawa class — 1 ship, ex-Project 56AE
Warszawa class — 1 ship ex-Project 61MP

Portugal (Marinha Portuguesa) 
Tejo class — 1 ship
Guadiana class — 4 ships
Liz class — 1 ship
Vouga class — 5 ships

Romania (Romanian Navy) 
  — 2 ships
Mărăști class - 2 ships (Aquila-class scout cruisers rearmed as destroyers)
Amiral Murgescu class - 1 ship completed (minelaying destroyer escort)

Russia/USSR (Russian Navy)

Imperial Russian Navy

Soviet Navy 
Leningrad class — 6 ships
Tashkent class — 1 ship
Gnevny class — 28 ships
Soobrazitelnyy class — 18 ships
Opytny class — 1 ship
Ognevoy class — 11 ships
Zhivushiy (ex-USS) class — 9 ships
Likhoy class — 2 ships, ex-Regele Ferdinand class
Legky class — 2 ships, ex-Marasti class
Prytky class — 2 ships, ex-Zerstörer 1934A class
Prochny class — 1 ship, ex-German Zerstörer 1936A class
Soldati class — 2 ships, ex-Soldati class
Skoryy class — 70 ships
Neustrashimy class — 1 ship
Kotlin class — 27 ships
Kildin class — 4 ships
Krupny class — 7 ships
Kashin class — 25 ships
Sovremennyy class — 21 ships
Udaloy class — 16 ships

Siam (Royal Siamese Navy) 
Sua Taynchon class — 2 ships
Phra Ruang class — 1 ship

South Africa (South African Navy) 
W class — 2 ships

South Korea (Republic of Korea Navy) 
Chungmu class — 3 ships, ex-Fletcher class
Chungbuk class — 7 ships, ex-Gearing class
Dae Gu class  — 2 ships, ex-Allen M. Sumner class
Gwanggaeto the Great class — 3 ships
Chungmugong Yi Sunshin class — 6 ships
Sejong the Great class — 3 ships

Spain (Armada Española) 
Destructor class — 1 ship
Furor class — 6 ships
Bustamante class — 3 ships
Alsedo class — 3 ships
Churruca class — 16 ships
Teruel class — 2 ships
Ceuta class — 2 ships
Liniers class — 2 ships
Audaz class — 9 ships
Oquendo class — 3 ships
Lepanto class — 5 ships, ex-Fletcher class
Churruca class — 5 ships, ex-Gearing class

Sweden (Swedish Navy) 
Ragnar class — 3 ships
Hugin class — 2 ships
Wrangel class — 2 ships
Ehrenskold class — 2 ships
Klas class — 2 ships
Göteborg class — 6 ships
Psilander class — 2 ships
Romulus class — 2 ships
Mode class — 4 ships
Visby class — 4 ships
Öland class — 2 ships
Halland class — 2 ships
Östergotland class — 4 ships

Turkey (Osmanlı Donanması / Türk Deniz Kuvvetleri) 
Samsun class — 4 ships
Muavenet-i Milliye class — 4 ships
Adatepe class — 2 ships
Tinaztepe class — 2 ships
Gaziantep class — 4 ships (ex-)
Demirhisar class — 4 ships (ex-)
Alp Arslan class — 4 ships (ex-M class)
Geyret class — 1 ship (ex-)
İstanbul class — 5 ships (ex-)
Zafer class - 1 ship (ex-
Zafer class — 2 ships (ex-)
Yücetepe class — 10 ships (ex-)
Alçıtepe class — 2 ships (ex-)
Berk class — 2 ships (ex-)
Gelibolu class - 3 ships (ex-)

United Kingdom (Royal Navy)

Torpedo Boat Destroyers 
In 1913, the surviving units among the large heterogeneous array of older Torpedo Boat Destroyer types of the "27-knotter" and "30-knotter" varieties were organised into the A, B, C and D classes according to their design speed and the number of funnels they possessed. The earlier "26-knotters" were not included as all six vessels had been deleted before 1913.

26-knot classes
Daring class — 2 ships
Havock class — 2 ships
Ferret class — 2 ships
A class; (27-knot classes) — 36 original ships in this group
Ardent class — 3 ships
Charger class — 3 ships
Fervent class — 2 ships
Hardy class — 2 ships
Janus class — 3 ships
Salmon class — 2 ships
Banshee class — 3 ships
Conflict class — 3 ships
Handy class — 3 ships
Opossum class — 3 ships
Rocket class — 3 ships
Sturgeon class — 3 ships
Swordfish class — 2 ships
Zebra class — 1 ship
B class (4-funnelled,  classes)
Quail class — 4 ships
Earnest class — 6 ships
Spiteful class — 2 ships
Myrmidon class — 2 ships
C class (3-funnelled,  classes)
Star class — 6 ships
Avon class — 3 ships
Brazen class — 4 ships
Violet class — 2 ships
Mermaid class — 2 ships
Gipsy class — 3 ships
Bullfinch class — 3 ships
Fawn class — 6 ships
Falcon class — 2 ships
Greyhound class — 3 ships
Thorn class — 3 ships
Hawthorn special type — 2 ships
Thornycroft special — 1 ship
Armstrong-Whitworth special, — 1 ship
D class; (2-funnelled,  classes)
Unlike the A, B and C classes, all the (two-funnel) D class were built by one shipbuilder (Thornycroft) and comprised a single class, with minor modifications between batches.
Desperate group — 4 ships
Angler group — 2 ships
Coquette group — 3 ships
Stag special type — 1 ship
Taku type — 1 ship, ex-Chinese prize

Conventional destroyers 
In 1913, lettered names were given to all Royal Navy destroyers, previously known after the first ship of that class. The River or E class of 1913 were the first destroyers of the Royal Navy with a recognisable modern configuration.
River or E class — 33 ships
Tribal or F class — 13 ships
Beagle or G class — 16 ships
Acorn or H class — 20 ships
Acheron or I class — 23 ships
Acasta or K class — 20 ships
Swift type — 1 ship
Laforey or L class — 22 ships
Arno type — 1 ship
Admiralty M class — 74 ships
Hawthorn M class — 2 ships
Yarrow M class — 10 ships
Thornycroft M class — 6 ships
Talisman class — 4 ships
Medea class — 4 ships
Faulknor class leader — 4 ships
Marksman class leader — 7 ships
Parker class leader — 6 ships
Admiralty R class — 39 ships
Yarrow Later M class — 7 ships
Thornycroft R class — 5 ships
Admiralty modified R class — 11 ships
Admiralty S class — 55 ships
Yarrow S class — 7 ships
Thornycroft S class — 5 ships
Admiralty V class — 28 ships
Admiralty W class — 19 ships
Thornycroft V and W class — 4 ships
Thornycroft modified W class — 2 ships
Admiralty modified W class — 15 ships
Admiralty type leader — 8 ships
Thornycroft type leader or Shakespeare class — 5 ships
Ambuscade type — 1 ship
Amazon type — 1 ship
Inter-war standard classes
A class — 9 ships
B class — 9 ships
C class — 5 ships
D class — 9 ships
E class — 9 ships
F class — 9 ships
G class — 9 ships
H class — 9 ships
I class — 9 ships
ex-Brazilian H class — 6 ships
ex-Turkish I class — 2 ships
Tribal class — 27 ships
J, K and N class — 24 ships
Hunt class — 83 ships
L and M class — 16 ships
Town class — 50 ships from three classes of United States Navy destroyers, transferred 1940
World War II War Emergency Programme classes
O and P class — 16 ships
Q and R class — 16 ships
S and T class — 16 ships
U and V class — 16 ships
W and Z class — 16 ships
C class — 32 ships
Battle class — 23 ships
Weapon class — 4 ships
Laid down post-war
Daring class — 8 ships

Guided-missile destroyers 
County class — 8 ships
Type 82 — 1 ship
Type 42 — 14 ships (6 Sheffield, 4 Exeter, 4 Manchester)
Type 45 — 6 ships, commissioned 2009–2013

United States (United States Navy) 

Bainbridge class — 13 ships
Truxtun class — 3 ships
Smith class — 5 ships
Paulding class — 21 ships
Cassin class — 8 ships
O'Brien class — 6 ships
Tucker class — 6 ships
Sampson class — 6 ships
Caldwell class — 6 ships
Wickes class — 111 ships
Clemson class — 156 ships
Farragut class (1934) — 8 ships
Porter class — 8 ships
Mahan class — 18 ships
Gridley class — 4 ships
Bagley class — 8 ships
Somers class — 5 ships
Benham class — 10 ships
Sims class — 12 ships
Gleaves class — 66 ships
Benson class — 30 ships
Fletcher class — 175 ships
Allen M. Sumner class — 58 ships
Gearing class — 98 ships
Mitscher class — 4 ships
Forrest Sherman class — 18 ships
Farragut class (1958) — 10 ships
Charles F. Adams class — 23 ships
Spruance class — 30 ships
Kidd class — 4 ships
Arleigh Burke class — 62 ships, 1989– (further ships are being constructed or planned)
Zumwalt class — 3 ships (in construction or planning)

Ukraine (Ukrainian Navy) 
Leitenant Pushchin class - 2 ships
Ukrayna class - 1 ship

Venezuela (ARBV) 
Allen M. Sumner-class - 2 ships
Nueva Esparta class — 3 ships
Almirante Clemente class — 6 ships

Yugoslavia (Yugoslav Navy) 
Dubrovnik class — 1 ship
Beograd class — 3 ships
Split class — 1 ship
W class — 2 ships

Notes

References
 

Classes